Junk Ensemble (styled junk ensemble) is an Irish dance theatre company working in a genre related to Tanztheater. The company was established in 2004 by identical twin sisters Jessica and Megan Kennedy. It is based in Dublin and tours throughout Europe and North America. Its productions focus on unique and original visuals and production methods.

Awards
Junk Ensemble won the Culture Ireland Touring Award in 2008. In 2011, they won the Dublin Fringe Festival Best Production Award for their production Bird with Boy,<ref name="Winners of Dublin Fringe Festival">{{cite web|title=Winners of Dublin Fringe Festival|url=http://www.dailyedge.ie/and-the-winners-are-absolut-fringe-fest-2011-awards-237900-Sep2011/}}</ref> and Drinking Dust was listed as an Irish Times Highlight the same year.

PressThe Sunday Times has written that "junk ensemble has created some of the most impressive contemporary dance in Ireland of recent years"  and Irish Theatre Magazine wrote that Junk Ensemble "do not disappoint in artistic experiment with bold visual staging and musical adventuring."

Productions
Productions are listed with the year and venue of their debut.
 The Rain Party (2007)
 Drinking Dust (2008)
 Pygmalian Revisited (2010) - Aix-en Provence Festival
 Five Ways to Drown (2010) - Dublin Dance Festival 
 Sometimes We Break (2012) - Tate Britain 
 Bird with Boy (2011) - Dublin Fringe Festival 
 The Falling Song (2012) - Dublin Dance Festival 
 Blind Runner (2013) - Dance Ireland, short film
 Dusk Ahead (2013) - Kilkenny Arts Festival 
 It Folds (2015) - Abbey Theatre,  joint production with Brokentalkers
 Walking Pale (2016) - Dublin Dance Festival
 Soldier Still (2017) - Dublin Fringe Festival
 Dolores'' (2018) - Dublin Dance Festival

References

External links
 

Dance companies in Ireland